Uzi Rabi, an Israeli, is the Director of the Moshe Dayan Center for Middle Eastern Studies at Tel Aviv University.

Publications 

 "The Military of Qajar Iran: The Features of an Irregular Army from the Eighteenth Century to the Early Twentieth Century," Iranian Studies, Vol. 45, No. 3, pp. 333–354. By Uzi Rabi and Nugzar Ter-Oganov
 "The Shi'ite Crescent: An Iranian Vision and Arab Fear," Geopolitics, forthcoming.
 Russia and Iran: Relationship of an Ambiguous Nature," Defensor Pacis, Issue 21.
 "The Russian Military Mission and the Birth of the Persian Cossack Brigade: 1879-1894," Iranian Studies, forthcoming.
 "Oman's Foreign Policy: The Art of Keeping All Channels of Communication Open," Orient (Hamburg: DOI, 2005), pp. 549–564
 "Oman and the Arab–Israeli Conflict: The Reflection of a Pragmatic Foreign Policy," Israel Affairs (Oxon: Routledge, 2005), Vol. 11, pp. 535–551
 “The Dynamics of the Gulf Cooperation Council (GCC): The Ceaseless Quest for Regional Security in a Changing Region,” Orient (Hamburg: DOI, 2004), pp. 281–295.
 “Oil Politics and Tribal Rulers in Eastern Arabia: The Reign of Shakhbut (1928-1966),” British Journal of Middle Eastern Studies (2004).
 "Kuwait’s Changing Strategic Posture: Historical Patterns," Journal of South Asian and Middle Eastern Studies (Villanova: Villanova University, 2004), Vol. 27, No. 4, pp. 52–65
 "Majlis al-Shura and Majlis al-Dawla: State Formation in an Oil State: Oman as a Case Study," Middle Eastern Studies, vol. 38, no. 4, October 2002. pp. 41–50.
 “The Kuwaiti Royal Family in the Post-liberation Period: Reinstitutionalizing the 'First among Equals' System in Kuwait”, in: J. Kostiner (ed.), Middle East Monarchies: The Challenge of Modernity (Boulder, London: Lynne Rienner, 2000)
 “The Shi’is in Bahrain: Class and Religious Protest”, in: O. Benjio and G. Ben-Dor (eds.), Minorities in the Middle East (Boulder, London: Lynne Rienner, 1999), pp. 171–188

Books

Yemen: Revolution, Civil War, and Unification
 The Gulf States: Between Iran and the West, edited by Prof. Uzi Rabi and Yoel Guzansky. A joint publication by the Moshe Dayan Center and the Institute for National Security Studies
 Yemen: The Anatomy of a Failed State (forthcoming).
 International Intervention in Local Conflicts: Crisis Management and Conflict Resolution Since the Cold War
 The Emergence of States in a Tribal Society: Oman Under Sa'id bin Taymur, 1932-1970
 Iran Time (Hebrew)
 Saudi Arabia: An Oil Kingdom in the Labyrinth of Religion and Politics (Hebrew)

Notes 

Academic staff of Tel Aviv University
Living people
Year of birth missing (living people)